Vyacheslav Viktorovich Mikhaylevsky (born 6 May 1991) is a Russian rower. He won the gold medal in the quadruple sculls at the 2015 European Rowing Championships.

References

External links
 

1991 births
Living people
Russian male rowers
People from Krasnodar
European Rowing Championships medalists